John Patrick Riley (June 15, 1920 – February 3, 2016) was an American ice hockey player and coach. The hockey coach at West Point for more than 35 years, Riley coached the United States to the gold medal at the 1960 Squaw Valley Olympics. He played for the U.S. Olympic team at the 1948 St. Moritz Olympics.

Biography
Riley was born in Boston in 1920 and raised in Medford, Massachusetts. He played prep-school hockey at Tabor Academy and was graduated in 1939. He played college hockey at Dartmouth College (1940–1942 and 1946–47) as well as for the U.S. Naval Air Corps (1942–1946). In 1948 he was part of an American team that was disqualified as two rival teams arrived for the Americans at the St. Moritz Olympics. (See Ice hockey at the 1948 Winter Olympics.) He was then player-coach of the national team at the 1949 IIHF World Championship.

Riley began his Army coaching career in 1950, remaining the Cadets' head coach through 1986. During his tenure, he twice won the Spencer Penrose Award for NCAA Coach of the Year. He was replaced by one of his sons, Rob Riley in 1986. Another son, Brian Riley, took over the job from Rob in 2004. Rob's son Brett was named as the inaugural head coach at Long Island University in 2020.

Riley was appointed to coach the USA team for the 1960 Olympic Games, the ninth held with hockey. The United States had finished with a silver medal in the last two Games in 1952 and 1956, with the latter being the first time the Soviet Union had won the gold medal. One of Riley's last decisions before the Games was to cut Herb Brooks (fresh from his play at Minnesota) from the team. Days later, his American team surprised the hockey world going undefeated in winning the country's first Olympic gold medal. Twenty years later, Brooks would be hired to coach the American team at Lake Placid, New York, which resulted in a gold medal for the country, which beat the Soviets (who had not lost to the Americans since 1960) on February 22, 1980 in the medal round before beating Finland to win the gold; the win over the Soviets is now referred to as the "Miracle on Ice". In Olympic hockey from 1956 to 1988, Riley and Brooks were the only coaches to lead a team to a gold medal over the Soviet Union. 

Riley was inducted in the United States Hockey Hall of Fame in 1979, and the International Ice Hockey Federation Hall of Fame in 1998. He is a two-time winner of the Lester Patrick Trophy, in 1986 (as a coach) and 2002 (as a member of the Olympic gold medal-winning United States hockey team of 1960).

In the 1960s, Riley ran the Eastern Hockey Clinic (a hockey camp for high school-age players) in Worcester, Massachusetts. The camp had many NHL players as coaches, including John Ferguson, Tommy Williams (the only American NHL player at the time), Jean Ratelle, and Charlie Hodge. He died on February 3, 2016, at a retirement home in Sandwich, Massachusetts.

Head coaching record

See also
List of college men's ice hockey coaches with 400 wins

References

External links
masshockey.com Hall of Fame page

1920 births
2016 deaths
American ice hockey coaches
American men's ice hockey forwards
United States Navy personnel of World War II
Army Black Knights men's ice hockey coaches
Boston Olympics players
Dartmouth Big Green men's ice hockey players
Ice hockey coaches from Massachusetts
Ice hockey players at the 1948 Winter Olympics
IIHF Hall of Fame inductees
Lester Patrick Trophy recipients
Sportspeople from Medford, Massachusetts
United States Hockey Hall of Fame inductees
Tabor Academy (Massachusetts) alumni
Ice hockey players from Massachusetts